Gladiolus (plural gladioli) is a genus of perennial flowering plants in the iris family.

Gladiolus may also refer to :

 Gladiolus, the body of the sternum
 Gladiolus, a 1992 card game by Society of Ancients
 Gladiolus, a fictional character in Final Fantasy XV
 "Gladiolus", a song from Darling in the Franxx Original Soundtrack Volume 3
 "Gladiolus", a song by Every Little Thing from the 2008 album Door
 , the name of two Royal Navy ships
 Gladiolus-class corvette
 , a Union Navy steamship

See also

 
 Gladiola (disambiguation)
 Gladius (disambiguation)
 Gladiator (disambiguation)
 Gladiatrix (disambiguation)
 List of Gladiolus cultivars